Closer to the People is the ninth studio album by the British singer Tanita Tikaram. The record was released on 11 March 2016 through Ear Music, an imprint of German-based label Edel Music. The album also produced two singles: "Glass Love Train" and "The Way You Move".

Background
Closer to the People is Tikaram's first album in four years. Like her previous album Can't Go Back, it was released through Ear Music. Tikaram released a videoclip for the song "Food on My Table" in December 2015, although she stated this record was not the first single of the album. Tikaram said that the record is inspired by the blues compositions she likes to play with her band. Tikaram also explained to HuffPost UK that her latest music began taking form after she read a biography of American jazz singer Anita O'Day, who overcame her problems to perform jazz music for some 60 years.

Reception
Michael Smith of Renowned for Sound wrote  "As such, Closer To The People isn’t an album for everybody. Jazz fans, or fans of Tanita Tikaram’s particular style of lyricism and husky vocals, will surely find it easier to get into than the new listener, but even on a cursory listen the album has its charm that makes it enjoyable. Had the scope of its songs been larger the appeal of the album may also have followed suit, but ultimately it remains in a rather subtle position".

Track listing

Credits
Arranged By – Mark Creswell (tracks: 1), Tanita Tikaram (tracks: 6 10)
Design – Alexander Mertsch
Mastered By – Tim Young
Other (string day assistant to Goetz) – Jonny Firth
Photography – Kurt Stallaert
Producer, arranger – Angie Pollock (tracks: 1 2 3 4 5 7 8 9)
Producer, recorded by, mixed by – Goetz Botzenhardt

Chart performance

References

External links

2016 albums
Tanita Tikaram albums